Jeffrey Woywitka (born September 1, 1983) is a Canadian former professional ice hockey defenceman who played in the National Hockey League (NHL) for the St. Louis Blues, Dallas Stars, and New York Rangers.

Playing career
Woywitka was drafted from the Red Deer Rebels in the first round, 27th overall by the Philadelphia Flyers in the 2001 NHL Entry Draft. After reporting to Philadelphia's AHL affiliate for his first professional season in 03–04, he was traded to the Edmonton Oilers midway through the season along with a first round pick (Rob Schremp) in 2004 and a third round pick (Danny Syvret) in 2005 in exchange for Mike Comrie.

In 2005, he was traded by the Edmonton Oilers along with Eric Brewer and Doug Lynch to the St. Louis Blues for 2000 league MVP, Chris Pronger.
On July 7, 2009, Woywitka signed a two-year contract with the Dallas Stars, which ended when Woywitka entered the free agency on July 1, 2011.

On August 15, 2011, Woywitka signed a one-year contract with the Montreal Canadiens. At the commencement of the 2011–12 season, Woywitka failed to make the opening night roster for the Canadiens, and was placed on waivers with the intent to be reassigned to their AHL affiliate. The following day on October 6, 2011, Woywitka was claimed off waivers by the New York Rangers, where he was subsequently used primarily as a depth defenseman appearing in 27 games for 6 points.

On July 2, 2012, he returned to the St. Louis Blues as an unrestricted free agent on a one-year contract.

Woywitka played for Augsburger Panther of the German Deutsche Eishockey Liga for the 2013–14 and 2014–15 seasons before retiring.

Career statistics

International

Awards and honours

References

External links
 

1983 births
Living people
Augsburger Panther players
Canadian ice hockey defencemen
Connecticut Whale (AHL) players
Dallas Stars players
Edmonton Road Runners players
Ice hockey people from Alberta
National Hockey League first-round draft picks
New York Rangers players
People from the County of Vermilion River
Peoria Rivermen (AHL) players
Philadelphia Flyers draft picks
Philadelphia Phantoms players
Red Deer Rebels players
St. Louis Blues players
Toronto Roadrunners players
Canadian expatriate ice hockey players in Germany